
Year 144 (CXLIV) was a leap year starting on Tuesday (link will display the full calendar) of the Julian calendar. At the time, it was known as the Year of the Consulship of Rufus and Maximus (or, less frequently, year 897 Ab urbe condita). The denomination 144 for this year has been used since the early medieval period, when the Anno Domini calendar era became the prevalent method in Europe for naming years.

Events 
 By place 
 Roman Empire 
 Lucius Hedius Rufus Lollianus Avitus and Titus Statilius Maximus become Roman Consuls.
 The Roman campaigns in Mauretania begin. 

 Asia 
 Change of era name from Hanan (3rd year) to Jiankang era of the Chinese Han Dynasty.
 Change of emperor from Han Shundi to Han Chongdi of the Han Dynasty.
 Reign of Huvishka, emperor of the Kushan Empire.

 By topic 
 Religion 
 Change of Patriarch of Constantinople from Polycarpus II to Athendodorus (until 148).
 Marcion of Sinope is excommunicated; a sect, Marcionism, grows out of his beliefs.

Births 
 Kahiko-Lue-Mea, Hawaiian ruler

Deaths 
 September 20 – Han Shundi, Chinese emperor (b. 115)
 Polemon of Laodicea, Greek sophist (b. c. AD 90)

References